The 1973 Piccadilly World Match Play Championship was the tenth World Match Play Championship. It was played from Thursday 11 to Saturday 13 October on the West Course at Wentworth. Eight players competed in a straight knock-out competition, with each match contested over 36 holes. The champion received £10,000 out of a total prize fund of £30,000. In the final, Gary Player beat Graham Marsh at the fourth extra hole to win the championship for the fifth time.

In a close final, Player holed a 7-foot birdie putt at the 36th hole to tie the match after Marsh's second shot had found a green-side bunker and he was unable to get down in two more. Player had to get up and down from bunkers at the first two extra holes to extend the match. At the fourth extra hole, he holed from 9 feet and then Marsh missed from 3 feet to give Player the victory.

Course
Source:

Scores
Source:

Prize money
The winner received £10,000, the runner-up £5,000, the losing semi-finalists £3,500 and the first round losers £2,000, making a total prize fund of £30,000.

References

Volvo World Match Play Championship
Golf tournaments in England
Piccadilly World Match Play Championship
Piccadilly World Match Play Championship
Piccadilly World Match Play Championship